Harold Backer (born 20 November 1962 in Selkirk, Manitoba) is a Canadian former Olympic rower and financial advisor.

Olympic rowing 
He participated in three Olympic Games for the Canadian rowing team: 1984 in Los Angeles, 1988 in Seoul and 1992 in Barcelona.

After retirement as an Olympic athlete, he became a rowing coach.

Financial advisor and disappearance 
Backer established financial advisory firm Financial Backer Corp. In 2015 he disappeared after allegedly setting up a pyramid scheme that ran into trouble. His disappearance caused a B.C. wide search at the time, and was covered in an episode of The Fifth Estate.

In April 2017 he turned himself in to the police.

See also 
 Victoria City Rowing Club

References

1962 births
Living people
Canadian male rowers
Olympic rowers of Canada
People from Selkirk, Manitoba
Rowers at the 1984 Summer Olympics
Rowers at the 1988 Summer Olympics
Rowers at the 1992 Summer Olympics